Chinguila (born August 14, 1978) is an Angolan football player. He has played for Angola national team.

National team statistics

References

1978 births
Living people
Angolan footballers
Association football defenders
Angola international footballers